The Smith Bly House is a historic house located in Ashville, Chautauqua County, New York.

Description and history 
It is a two-story, three-bay-wide, timber-framed, Greek Revival style residence built in about 1835. The entrance features a carved architrave supported by Ionic columns. As described in state records, "The west facades of the main block and wing are finished with flush weatherboards; each facade is divided and framed by elaborately fluted Ionic pilasters. The remainder is clapboarded. The entire structure is painted white. The main entrance is reached by a three-step stair of dressed stone. One brick chimney with rebuilt top is located in the main block."

It was listed on the National Register of Historic Places on October 1, 1974.

References

External links

Houses on the National Register of Historic Places in New York (state)
Historic American Buildings Survey in New York (state)
Greek Revival houses in New York (state)
Houses completed in 1835
Houses in Chautauqua County, New York
National Register of Historic Places in Chautauqua County, New York